Freya Coombe is an English football manager and former player who currently manages Angel City FC of the American National Women's Soccer League (NWSL).

Early life
Coombe grew up in Buckinghamshire.

Club career
Coombe played for Reading for five years.

Managerial career
Coombe coached in various roles at Reading over a seven-year period, including managing the club's reserve team. She then moved to the United States and coached youth soccer in the New York metropolitan area.

In September 2019, Coombe was named interim head coach of Sky Blue FC of the National Women's Soccer League. The team removed her interim tag in December 2019.

In August 2021, Coombe was named head coach of Angel City FC for the 2022 NWSL season.

References

External links
 Freya Coombe at LinkedIn

English women's football managers
National Women's Soccer League coaches
NJ/NY Gotham FC coaches
English women's footballers
English expatriate football managers
Reading F.C. Women players
Year of birth missing (living people)
Living people
English expatriate sportspeople in the United Arab Emirates
Sportspeople from Reading, Berkshire
Footballers from Berkshire
Women's association footballers not categorized by position
Angel City FC coaches